Gender incongruence is the state of having a gender identity that does not correspond to one's sex assigned at birth. This is experienced by people who identify as transgender or transsexual, and often results in gender dysphoria. The causes of gender incongruence have been studied for decades. The most studied factors are biological, especially brain structure differences with relation to biology and sexual orientation. Environmental factors have also been proposed.

Transgender brain studies, especially those on trans women attracted to women (gynephilic), and those on trans men attracted to men (androphilic), are limited, as they include only a small number of tested individuals.
Studies conducted on twins suggest that there are likely genetic causes of gender incongruence, although the precise genes involved are not known or fully understood. One study published in the International Journal of Transgender Health found that in 20% of identical twin pairs, if one twin was trans, the other was as well, compared to only 2.6% of non-identical twins where this was the case; researchers attribute this to their shared genetics.

Sexologist Ray Blanchard created a taxonomy of male-to-female transsexualism that proposes two distinct etiologies for androphilic and gynephilic individuals; this taxonomy has become controversial, supported by J. Michael Bailey, Anne Lawrence, James Cantor and others, but opposed by Charles Allen Moser, Julia Serano, and the World Professional Association for Transgender Health.

Biological factors

Genetics
A 2008 study compared the genes of 112 trans women who were mostly already undergoing hormone treatment, with 258 cisgender male controls. Trans women were more likely than cisgender males to have a longer version of a receptor gene (longer repetitions of the gene) for the sex hormone androgen, which reduced its effectiveness at binding testosterone. The androgen receptor (NR3C4) is activated by the binding of testosterone or dihydrotestosterone, where it plays a critical role in the forming of primary and secondary male sex characteristics. The research weakly suggests reduced androgen and androgen signaling contributes to trans women's identity. The authors say that a decrease in testosterone levels in the brain during development might prevent complete masculinization of trans women's brains, thereby causing a more feminized brain and a female gender identity.

A variant genotype for the CYP17 gene, which acts on the sex hormones pregnenolone and progesterone, has been found to be linked to transsexuality in trans men but not in trans women.  Most notably, transmasculine subjects not only had the variant genotype more frequently, but had an allele distribution equivalent to cisgender male controls, unlike the cisgender female controls. The paper concluded that the loss of a female-specific CYP17 T -34C allele distribution pattern is associated with transmasculinity.

Gender incongruence among twins 
In 2013, a twin study combined a survey of pairs of twins where one or both had undergone, or had plans and medical approval to undergo, gender transition, with a literature review of published reports of transgender twins. The study found that one third of identical twin pairs in the sample were both transgender: 13 of 39 (33%) monozygotic or identical pairs of assigned males and 8 of 35 (22.8%) pairs of assigned females. Among dizygotic or genetically non-identical twin pairs, there was only 1 of 38 (2.6%) pairs where both twins were trans. The significant percent of identical twin pairs in which both twins are trans and the virtual absence of dizygotic twins (raised in the same family at the same time) in which both were trans would provide evidence that transgender identity is significantly influenced by genetics if both sets were raised in different families.

Brain structure

General 
Transgender brain studies, especially those on trans women attracted to women (gynephilic), and those on trans men attracted to men (androphilic), are limited, as they include only a small number of tested individuals.
Several studies have found a correlation between gender identity and brain structure. A first-of-its-kind study by Zhou et al. (1995) found that in the bed nucleus of the stria terminalis (BSTc), a region of the brain known for sex and anxiety responses (and which is affected by prenatal androgens), cadavers of six trans women had female-normal BSTc size, similar to the study's cadavers of cisgender women. While the trans women had undergone hormone therapy, and all but one had undergone sex reassignment surgery, this was accounted for by including cadavers of non-trans female and male controls who, for a variety of medical reasons, had experienced hormone reversal. The controls still had sizes typical for their sex. No relationship to sexual orientation was found.

In a follow-up study, Kruijver et al. (2000) looked at the number of neurons in BSTc instead of volumes. They found the same results as Zhou et al. (1995), but with even more dramatic differences. One transfeminine subject who had never received hormone therapy was also included, and nonetheless matched up with the female neuron counts.

In 2002, a follow-up study by Chung et al. found that significant sexual dimorphism in BSTc did not establish until adulthood.  Chung et al. theorized that changes in fetal hormone levels produce changes in BSTc synaptic density, neuronal activity, or neurochemical content which later lead to size and neuron count changes in BSTc, or alternatively, that the size of BSTc is affected by the generation of a gender identity inconsistent with one's assigned sex.

It has been suggested that the BSTc differences may be a result of hormone replacement therapy. It has also been suggested that because pedophilic offenders have also been found to have a reduced BSTc, a feminine BSTc may be a marker for paraphilias rather than transgender identity.

In a review of the evidence in 2006, Gooren considered the earlier research as supporting the concept of gender incongruence as a sexual differentiation disorder of the sexually dimorphic brain. Dick Swaab (2004) concurred.

In 2008, Garcia-Falgueras & Swaab discovered that the interstitial nucleus of the anterior hypothalamus (INAH-3), part of the [[hypothalamic uncinate nucleus, had properties similar to the BSTc with respect to sexual dimorphism and gender incongruence. The same method of controlling for hormone usage was used as in Zhou et al. (1995) and Kruijver et al. (2000). The differences were even more pronounced than with BSTc; control males averaged 1.9 times the volume and 2.3 times the neurons as control females, yet regardless of hormone exposure, trans women were within the female range and the trans men within the male range.

A 2009 MRI study by Luders et al. found that among 24 trans women not treated with hormone therapy, regional gray matter concentrations were more similar to those of cisgender men than of cisgender women, but there was a significantly greater volume of gray matter in the right putamen compared to cisgender men. Like earlier studies, researchers concluded that transgender identity was associated with a distinct cerebral pattern. MRI scanning allows easier study of larger brain structures, but independent nuclei are not visible due to lack of contrast between different neurological tissue types, hence other studies on e.g. BSTc were done by dissecting brains post-mortem.

Rametti et al. (2011) studied 18 trans men who had not undergone hormone therapy using diffusion tensor imaging (DTI), an MRI technique which allows visualizing white matter, the structure of which is sexually dimorphic. Rametti et al. discovered that the trans men's white matter, compared to 19 cisgender gynephilic females, showed higher fractional anisotropy values in posterior part of the right SLF, the forceps minor and corticospinal tract". Compared to 24 cisgender males, they showed only lower FA values in the corticospinal tract. The white matter patterns in trans men were found to be shifted in the direction of non-trans males.

Hulshoff Pol et al. (2006) studied gross brain volume in 8 trans men and in 6 trans women undergoing hormone therapy. They found that hormones altered the sizes of the hypothalamus in a gender-consistent manner: treatment with masculinizing hormones shifted the hypothalamus towards the male direction in the same way as in male controls, and treatment with feminizing hormones shifted the hypothalamus towards the female direction in the same way as female controls. They concluded: "The findings suggest that, throughout life, gonadal hormones remain essential for maintaining aspects of sex-specific differences in the human brain."

A 2011 review published in Frontiers in Neuroendocrinology found that "Female INAH3 and BSTc have been found in MtF transsexual persons. The only female-to-male (FtM) transsexual person available to us for study so far had a BSTc and INAH3 with clear male characteristics. (...) These sex reversals were found not to be influenced by circulating hormone levels in adulthood, and seem thus to have arisen during development" and that "All observations that support the neurobiological theory about the origin of transsexuality, i.e. that it is the sizes, the neuron numbers, and the functions and connectivity of brain structures, not the sex of their sexual organs, birth certificates or passports, that match their gender identities".

A 2015 review reported that two studies found a pattern of white matter microstructure differences away from a transgender person's birth sex, and toward their desired sex. In one of these studies, sexual orientation had no effect on the diffusivity measured.

A 2016 review agreed with the other reviews when considering androphilic trans women and gynephilic trans men. It reported that hormone treatment may have large effects on the brain, and that cortical thickness, which is generally thicker in cisgender women's brains than in cisgender men's brains, may also be thicker in trans women's brains, but is present in a different location to cisgender women's brains. It also stated that for both trans women and trans men, "cross-sex hormone treatment affects the gross morphology as well as the white matter microstructure of the brain. Changes are to be expected when hormones reach the brain in pharmacological doses. Consequently, one cannot take hormone-treated transsexual brain patterns as evidence of the transsexual brain phenotype because the treatment alters brain morphology and obscures the pre-treatment brain pattern."

A 2019 review in Neuropsychopharmacology found that among transgender individuals meeting diagnostic criteria for gender dysphoria, "cortical thickness, gray matter volume, white matter microstructure, structural connectivity, and corpus callosum shape have been found to be more similar to cisgender control subjects of the same preferred gender compared with those of the same natal sex."

A 2020 paper tried to investigate and differentiate between the two competing hypotheses of a neurodevelopmental cortical hypothesis that suggests the existence of different brain phenotypes vs a functional-based hypothesis in relation to regions involved in the own body perception.  Trans men, trans women, and cisgender women all had decreased connectivity compared with cisgender men in superior parietal regions, as part of the salience (SN) and the executive control (ECN) networks. Trans men also had weaker connectivity compared with cisgender men between intra-SN regions and weaker inter-network connectivity between regions of the SN, the default mode network (DMN), the ECN and the sensorimotor network. Trans women had lower small-worldness, modularity and clustering coefficient than cisgender men.

A 2021 review of brain studies published in the Archives of Sexual Behavior found that "although the majority of neuroanatomical, neurophysiological, and neurometabolic features" in transgender people "resemble those of their natal sex rather than those of their experienced gender", for trans women they found feminine and demasculinized traits, and vice versa for trans men. They stated that due to limitations and conflicting results in the studies that had been done, they could not draw general conclusions or identify-specific features that consistently differed between cisgender and transgender people. The review also found differences when comparing cisgender homosexual and heterosexual people, with the same limitations applying.

Androphilic vs. gynephilic trans women 
A 2016 review reported that early-onset androphilic transgender women have a brain structure similar to cisgender women's and unlike cisgender men's, but that they have their own brain phenotype. 
It also reported that gynephilic trans women differ from both cisgender female and male controls in non-dimorphic brain areas.
The available research indicates that the brain structure of androphilic trans women with early-onset gender dysphoria is closer to that of cisgender women than that of cisgender men. It also reports that gynephilic trans women differ from both cisgender female and male controls in non-dimorphic brain areas. Cortical thickness, which is generally thicker in cisgender women's brains than in cisgender men's brains, may also be thicker in trans women's brains, but is present in a different location to cisgender women's brains. For trans men, research indicates that those with early-onset gender dysphoria and who are gynephilic have brains that generally correspond to their assigned sex, but that they have their own phenotype with respect to cortical thickness, subcortical structures, and white matter microstructure, especially in the right hemisphere. Hormone therapy can also affect transgender people's brain structure; it can cause transgender women's brains to become closer to those of cisgender women, and morphological changes observed in the brains of trans men might be due to the anabolic effects of testosterone.

While MRI taken on gynephilic trans women have likewise shown differences in the brain from non-trans people, no feminization of the brain's structure has been identified. Neuroscientists Ivanka Savic and Stefan Arver at the Karolinska Institute used MRI to compare 24 gynephilic trans women with 24 cisgender female and 24 cisgender male controls. None of the study participants were undergoing hormone therapy. The researchers found sex-typical differentiation between the trans women and cisgender females, and the cisgender males; but the gynephilic trans women "displayed also singular features and differed from both control groups by having reduced thalamus and putamen volumes and elevated GM volumes in the right insular and inferior frontal cortex and an area covering the right angular gyrus".

The researchers concluded that:Berglund et al. (2008) tested the response of gynephilic trans women to two steroids hypothesized to be sex pheromones: the progestin-like 4,16-androstadien-3-one (AND) and the estrogen-like 1,3,5(10),16-tetraen-3-ol (EST). Despite the difference in sexual orientation, the trans women's hypothalamic networks activated in response to the AND pheromone, like the androphilic cis female control groups. Both groups experienced amygdala activation in response to EST. Gynephilic cis male control groups experienced hypothalamic activation in response to EST. However, the trans women also experienced limited hypothalamic activation to EST. The researchers concluded that in terms of pheromone activation, trans women occupy an intermediate position with predominantly female features. The transfeminine subjects had not undergone any hormonal treatment at the time of the study, according to their own declaration beforehand, and confirmed by repeated tests of hormonal levels.

Gynephilic trans men 
Fewer brain structure studies have been performed on transgender men than on transgender women. A team of neuroscientists, led by Nawata in Japan, used a technique called single-photon emission computed tomography (SPECT) to compare the regional cerebral blood flow (rCBF) of 11 gynephilic trans men with that of 9 androphilic cis females. Although the study did not include a sample of cisgender males so that a conclusion of "male shift" could be made, the study did reveal that the gynephilic trans men showed significant decrease in blood flow in the left anterior cingulate cortex and a significant increase in the right insula, two brain regions known to respond during sexual arousal.

A 2016 review reported that the brain structure of early-onset gynephilic trans men generally corresponds to their assigned sex, but that they have their own phenotype with respect to cortical thickness, subcortical structures, and white matter microstructure, especially in the right hemisphere. Morphological increments observed in the brains of trans men might be due to the anabolic effects of testosterone.

Prenatal androgen exposure 
Prenatal androgen exposure, the lack thereof, or low sensitivity to prenatal androgens are commonly cited as mechanisms to explain the above discoveries. To test this, studies have examined the differences between trans and cisgender individuals in digit ratio (a generally accepted marker for prenatal androgen exposure). A meta-analysis concluded that the effect sizes for this association were small or nonexistent.

In people with XX chromosomes, congenital adrenal hyperplasia (CAH) results in heightened exposure to prenatal androgens, resulting in masculinization of the genitalia. Individuals with CAH are typically subjected to medical interventions including prenatal hormone treatment and postnatal genital reconstructive surgeries. Such treatments are sometimes criticized by intersex rights organizations as non-consensual, invasive, and unnecessary interventions. Individuals with CAH are usually assigned female and tend to develop similar cognitive abilities to the typical females, including spatial ability, verbal ability, language lateralization, handedness and aggression. Research has shown that people with CAH and XX chromosomes will be more likely to experience same-sex attraction, and at least 5.2% of these individuals develop serious gender dysphoria.

In males with 5-alpha-reductase deficiency, conversion of testosterone to dihydrotestosterone is disrupted, decreasing the masculinization of genitalia. Individuals with this condition are typically assigned female and raised as girls due to their feminine appearance at a young age. However, more than half of males with this condition raised as females come to identify as male later in life. Scientists speculate that the definition of masculine characteristics during puberty and the increased social status afforded to men are two possible motivations for a female-to-male transition.

Psychological 
Psychiatrist and sexologist David Oliver Cauldwell argued in 1947 that transsexuality was caused by multiple factors. He believed that small boys tend to admire their mothers to such a degree that they end up wanting to be like them. However, he believed that boys would lose this desire as long as his parents set limits when raising him, or he had the right genetic predispositions or a normal sexuality. In 1966, Harry Benjamin considered the causes of transsexuality to be poorly understood, and argued that researchers were biased towards considering psychological causes over biological causes.

According to the DSM-5, gender dysphoria in those assigned male at birth tends to follow one of two broad trajectories: early-onset or late-onset. Early-onset gender dysphoria is behaviorally visible in childhood. Sometimes gender dysphoria will stop for a while in this group, and they will identify as gay or homosexual for a period of time, followed by recurrence of gender dysphoria. This group is usually androphilic in adulthood. Late-onset gender dysphoria does not include visible signs in early childhood, but some report having had wishes to be the opposite sex in childhood that they did not report to others. Trans women who experience late-onset gender dysphoria are more likely be attracted to women and may identify as lesbians or bisexual. It is common for people assigned male at birth who have late-onset gender dysphoria to experience sexual excitement from cross-dressing. In those assigned female at birth, early-onset gender dysphoria is the most common course. This group is usually sexually attracted to women. Trans men who experience late-onset gender dysphoria will usually be sexually attracted to men and may identify as gay.

Blanchard's typology 

In the 1980s and 1990s, sexologist Ray Blanchard developed a taxonomy of male-to-female transsexualism built upon the work of his colleague Kurt Freund, which argues that trans women have one of two primary causes of gender dysphoria. Blanchard theorized that "homosexual transsexuals" (a taxonomic category referring to trans women attracted to men) are attracted to men and develop gender dysphoria typically during childhood, and characterizes them as displaying overt and obvious femininity since childhood; he characterizes "non-homosexual transsexuals" (trans women who are sexually attracted to women) as developing gender dysphoria primarily due to autogynephilia (sexual arousal by the thought or image of themselves as a woman), and as attracted to women, attracted to both women and men (Blanchard calls this "pseudo-bisexuality", believing attraction to males to be not genuine, but part of the performance of an autogynephilic sexual fantasy), or asexual.

Blanchard's theory has received support from J. Michael Bailey, Anne Lawrence, James Cantor, and others who argue that there are significant differences between the two groups, including sexuality, age of transition, ethnicity, IQ, fetishism, and quality of adjustment. However, the theory has been criticized in papers from Veale, Nuttbrock, Moser, and others who argue that it is poorly representative of trans women and non-instructive, and that the experiments behind it are poorly controlled and/or contradicted by other data. A 2009 study by Charles Moser of 29 cisgender women in the healthcare field based on Blanchard's methods for identifying autogynephilia found that 93% of respondents qualified as autogynephiles based on their own responses. Moser's study was later criticized by Anne Lawrence, who argued that his scales differed significantly from Blanchard's, and that his questions "do not adequately assess the essential element of autogynephilia—sexual arousal simply to the thought of being a female." Moser responded that Lawrence had made multiple errors by comparing the wrong items.

Parenting
The failure of an attempt to raise David Reimer from infancy through adolescence as a girl after his genitals were accidentally mutilated is cited as disproving the theory that gender identity is determined solely by parenting. Reimer's case is used by organizations such as the Intersex Society of North America to caution against needlessly modifying the genitals of unconsenting minors.

Between the 1960s and 2000, many other male newborns and infants were surgically and socially reassigned as females if they were born with malformed penises, or if they lost their penises in accidents. At the time, surgical reconstruction of the vagina was more advanced than reconstruction of the penis, leading many doctors and psychologists, including John Money who oversaw Reimer's case, to recommend sex reassignment based on the idea that these patients would be happiest living as women with functioning genitalia.  Available evidence indicates that in such instances, parents were deeply committed to raising these children as girls and in as gender-typical a manner as possible. A 2005 review of these cases found that about half of natal males reassigned female lived as women in adulthood, including those who knew their medical history, suggesting that gender assignment and related social factors has a major, though not determinative, influence on eventual gender identity.

In 2015, the American Academy of Pediatrics released a webinar series on gender, gender identity, gender expression, transgender, etc.  In the first lecture Dr. Sherer explains that parents' influence (through punishment and reward of behavior) can influence gender expression but not gender identity. She cites a Smithsonian article that shows a photo of a 3 year old President Franklin D. Roosevelt with long hair, wearing a dress. Children as old as 6 wore gender neutral clothing, consisting of white dresses, until the 1940s.  In 1927, Time magazine printed a chart showing sex-appropriate colors, which consisted of pink for boys and  blue for girls. Dr. Sherer argued that children will modify their gender expression to seek reward from their parents and society but this will not affect their gender identity (their internal sense of self).

See also 
 Genetic diagnosis of intersex
 Feminine essence concept of transsexuality
 Intersex and LGBT
 Sexual identity

References 

Transgender studies
Psychological theories
Neuroscience
Behavioral neuroscience
Transsexualism
Behavioural genetics